Sobirdzhon Nazarov (3 February 1991, Dushanbe) is a Tajikistani boxer who competes as a middleweight. At the 2012 Summer Olympics he was defeated in the heats of the Men's middleweight by Mujandjae Kasuto.

References

External links

Living people
Olympic boxers of Tajikistan
Boxers at the 2012 Summer Olympics
Middleweight boxers
Tajikistani male boxers

1991 births
People from Dushanbe